In Romania's 2008 legislative election, held on 30 November, no party won an outright majority. The Democratic Liberal Party (PDL) won the largest number of seats, closely followed by the Social Democratic Party (PSD) + Conservative Party (PC) Alliance. It was thought that the third-placed National Liberal Party (PNL) would hold the key for the new government. It asked for the position of Prime Minister in its negotiations with the two parties.

Two days later, inexplicably, Stolojan renounced this designation, and was quickly replaced by Emil Boc,  (PDL) president and still incumbent Mayor of Cluj-Napoca to this day. The National Liberal Party (PNL), Democratic Alliance of Hungarians in Romania (UDMR), and the 18 Minorities Parties formed the Parliamentary Opposition.

The coalition originally had approximately 70% Parliament support, but the Social Democrats (PSD) pulled out of the coalition on 1 October 2009, in protest of the sacking of interior minister Dan Nica, and the government fell in a vote of no confidence on 13 October.

Senate 
He was replaced by Vasile Blaga on 28 November 2011. On 3 July 2012, Crin Antonescu replaced Blaga at the Senate Presidency. During Antonescu's tenure as interim President, the business of the Senate was carried by Vice President Petru Filip. Filip switched parties from the Democratic Liberal Party (PDL) to the Social Democratic Party (PSD) during the no confidence vote for the Ungureanu Cabinet. He also served as interim President of the Senate between the removal from office of Geoană and Blaga's election in 2011. At that time he was a PDL Vice President.

|- 
! style="text-align:center;" colspan=2 rowspan=2 | Party
! style="text-align:center;" colspan=2 | Election seating
! style="text-align:center;" rowspan=2 | Lost
! style="text-align:center;" rowspan=2 | Won
! style="text-align:center;" colspan=2 | Present seating
|-
! style="text-align:center;" | Seats
! style="text-align:center;" | %
! style="text-align:center;" | Seats
! style="text-align:center;" | %
|-
| 
| style="text-align:left;" | Democratic Liberal Party
| style="text-align:right;vertical-align:top;" | 51
| style="text-align:right;vertical-align:top;" | 37.22%
| style="text-align:right;vertical-align:top;" | 19
| style="text-align:right;vertical-align:top;" | 2
| style="text-align:right;vertical-align:top;" | 35
| style="text-align:right;vertical-align:top;" | 25.54%
|-
| 
| style="text-align:left;" | Social Democratic Party
| style="text-align:right;vertical-align:top;" | 49
| style="text-align:right;vertical-align:top;" | 35.76%
| style="text-align:right;vertical-align:top;" | 15
| style="text-align:right;vertical-align:top;" | 3
| style="text-align:right;vertical-align:top;" | 40
| style="text-align:right;vertical-align:top;" | 29.19%
|-
| 
| style="text-align:left;" | National Liberal Party
| style="text-align:right;vertical-align:top;" | 28
| style="text-align:right;vertical-align:top;" | 20.43%
| style="text-align:right;vertical-align:top;" | 16
| style="text-align:right;vertical-align:top;" | 4
| style="text-align:right;vertical-align:top;" | 27
| style="text-align:right;vertical-align:top;" | 19.70%
|-
| 
| style="text-align:left;" | Democratic Alliance of Hungarians in Romania
| style="text-align:right;vertical-align:top;" | 9
| style="text-align:right;vertical-align:top;" | 6.57%
| style="text-align:right;vertical-align:top;" | 2
| style="text-align:right;vertical-align:top;" | 0
| style="text-align:right;vertical-align:top;" | 7
| style="text-align:right;vertical-align:top;" | 5.10%
|-
| 
| style="text-align:left;" | National Union for the Progress of Romania
| style="text-align:right;vertical-align:top;" | —
| style="text-align:right;vertical-align:top;" | —
| style="text-align:right;vertical-align:top;" | 4
| style="text-align:right;vertical-align:top;" | 12
| style="text-align:right;vertical-align:top;" | 12
| style="text-align:right;vertical-align:top;" | 8.75%
|-
|  
| style="text-align:left;" | Independents
| style="text-align:right;vertical-align:top;" | —
| style="text-align:right;vertical-align:top;" | —
| style="text-align:right;vertical-align:top;" |  
| style="text-align:right;vertical-align:top;" | 2
| style="text-align:right;vertical-align:top;" | 2
| style="text-align:right;vertical-align:top;" | 1.45%
|-
| style="background-color:#FFFFFF;" | 
| style="text-align:left;" colspan=5 | Vacant seats
| style="text-align:right;vertical-align:top;" | 14
| style="text-align:right;vertical-align:top;" | —
|- style="background-color:#f0f0f0; font-weight:bold;"
| style="text-align:right;" colspan=2 |Total
| 137
| 100
| colspan=2 | —
| 137
| 100
|}

Chamber of Deputies 
She was removed from office on 3 July 2012, and replaced by Valeriu Zgonea, Chamber Vice President at that time.

|- 
! style="text-align:center;" colspan=2 rowspan=2 | Parliamentary Group
! style="text-align:center;" colspan=2 | Election seating
! style="text-align:center;" rowspan=2 | Lost
! style="text-align:center;" rowspan=2 | Won
! style="text-align:center;" colspan=2 | Present
|-
! style="text-align:center;" | Seats
! style="text-align:center;" | %
! style="text-align:center;" | Seats
! style="text-align:center;" | %
|-
| 
| style="text-align:left;" | Democratic Liberal Party
| style="text-align:right;vertical-align:top;" | 115
| style="text-align:right;vertical-align:top;" | 34.43%
| style="text-align:right;vertical-align:top;" | 29
| style="text-align:right;vertical-align:top;" | 12
| style="text-align:right;vertical-align:top;" | 106
| style="text-align:right;vertical-align:top;" | 31.73%
|-
| 
| style="text-align:left;" | Social Democratic Party
| style="text-align:right;vertical-align:top;" | 114
| style="text-align:right;vertical-align:top;" | 34.13%
| style="text-align:right;vertical-align:top;" | 29
| style="text-align:right;vertical-align:top;" | 2
| style="text-align:right;vertical-align:top;" | 91
| style="text-align:right;vertical-align:top;" | 27.24%
|-
| 
| style="text-align:left;" | National Liberal Party
| style="text-align:right;vertical-align:top;" | 65
| style="text-align:right;vertical-align:top;" | 19.46%
| style="text-align:right;vertical-align:top;" | 21
| style="text-align:right;vertical-align:top;" | 6
| style="text-align:right;vertical-align:top;" | 56
| style="text-align:right;vertical-align:top;" | 16.76%
|-
| 
| style="text-align:left;" | Democratic Alliance of Hungarians in Romania
| style="text-align:right;vertical-align:top;" | 22
| style="text-align:right;vertical-align:top;" | 6.58%
| style="text-align:right;vertical-align:top;" | 2
| style="text-align:right;vertical-align:top;" | 0
| style="text-align:right;vertical-align:top;" | 20
| style="text-align:right;vertical-align:top;" | 5.98%
|-
| 
| style="text-align:left;" | Ethnic minorities parties
| style="text-align:right;vertical-align:top;" | 18
| style="text-align:right;vertical-align:top;" | 5.39%
| style="text-align:right;vertical-align:top;" | 2
| style="text-align:right;vertical-align:top;" | 0
| style="text-align:right;vertical-align:top;" | 16
| style="text-align:right;vertical-align:top;" | 4.79%
|-
| 
| style="text-align:left;" | National Union for the Progress of Romania
| style="text-align:right;vertical-align:top;" | —
| style="text-align:right;vertical-align:top;" | —
| style="text-align:right;vertical-align:top;" | 16
| style="text-align:right;vertical-align:top;" | 16
| style="text-align:right;vertical-align:top;" | 12
| style="text-align:right;vertical-align:top;" | 3.59%
|-
| 
| style="text-align:left;" colspan=5 | Independents
| style="text-align:right;vertical-align:top;" | 8
| style="text-align:right;vertical-align:top;" | 2.39%
|-
| style="background-color:#FFFFFF;" | 
| style="text-align:left;" colspan=5 | Vacant seats
| style="text-align:right;vertical-align:top;" | 25
| style="text-align:right;vertical-align:top;" | —
|- style="background-color:#f0f0f0; font-weight:bold;"
| style="text-align:right;" colspan=2| Total
| 334
| 100
| colspan=2 | —
| 334
| 100
|}

During the 2009 Spring Session of the Parliament, two Inquiry Committees were constituted, along with an Inquiry Sub-Committee. One Committee was formed to examine Minister of Youth and Sport Monica Iacob-Ridzi, regarding her possible misuse of money spent on Youth Day festivities. The other investigated Minister of Environment and Sustainable Development, Nicolae Nemirschi, regarding the possible misuse of money spent by his Ministry on the promotion of Governmental Programs. The Sub-Committee was formed to review former Prime Minister Călin Popescu-Tăriceanu, regarding the possible fraudulent allocation of oil drilling rights in the Snake Island area, recently gained by Romania.

The Chamber of Deputies was called in an Extraordinary Session in July to receive the reports of the Ridzi Inquiry Committee and Tăriceanu Inquiry Sub-Committee, and the formation of a new Inquiry Committee for the Minister of Tourism, Elena Udrea, regarding the possible misuse of money spent by her Ministry on tourism ads.

By-elections 

|-
! style="background-color:#E9E9E9;text-align:center;" width=100 | Date
! style="background-color:#E9E9E9;text-align:center;" width=80 | College - Constituency
! style="background-color:#E9E9E9;text-align:center;" colspan=2 | Candidates
! style="background-color:#E9E9E9;text-align:center;" width=350 | Parties and alliances
! style="background-color:#E9E9E9;text-align:center;" | Votes
! style="background-color:#E9E9E9;text-align:center;" width=50 | %
|- 
! rowspan=4 | 17 January 2010
| rowspan=2 | CD 1-42
| 
! style="text-align:left;" | Radu Stroe
! style="text-align:left;" | National Liberal Party (Partidul Naţional Liberal)
! style="text-align:right;vertical-align:top;" | 7,625
! style="text-align:right;vertical-align:top;" | 70.17%
|-
| 
| style="text-align:left;" | Honorius Prigoană
| style="text-align:left;" | Democratic Liberal Party (Partidul Democrat-Liberal)
| style="text-align:right;vertical-align:top;" | 3,242
| style="text-align:right;vertical-align:top;" | 29.83%
|-
| style="text-align:left;" colspan=4 | Total valid votes (40,583 expected voters) (turnout 27.12% - 11,006)
| style="text-align:right;vertical-align:top;" | 10,867
| style="text-align:right;vertical-align:top;" | 100.00%
|-
| style="text-align:left;" colspan=6 |Source: Biroul Electoral Municipal 
|- 
! rowspan=4 | 25 April 2010
| rowspan=2 | CD 19-42
| 
! style="text-align:left;" | Teo Trandafir
! style="text-align:left;" | Democratic Liberal Party (Partidul Democrat-Liberal)
! style="text-align:right;vertical-align:top;" | 
! style="text-align:right;vertical-align:top;" | 53.59%
|-
| 
| style="text-align:left;" | Liliana Mincă
| style="text-align:left;" | PSD+PC Electoral Alliance (Alianţa Electorală PSD+PC)
| style="text-align:right;vertical-align:top;" | 
| style="text-align:right;vertical-align:top;" | 46.41%
|-
| style="text-align:left;" colspan=4 | Total valid votes (103,204 expected voters) (turnout 14.84%)
| style="text-align:right;vertical-align:top;" | 15,093
| style="text-align:right;vertical-align:top;" | 100.00%
|-
| style="text-align:left;" colspan=6 |Source: Autoritatea Electorală Permanentă 
|- 
! rowspan=10 | 28 November 2010
| rowspan=8  | CD 3-22
| 
! style="text-align:left;" | Mariana Câmpeanu
! style="text-align:left;" | National Liberal Party (Partidul Naţional Liberal)
! style="text-align:right;vertical-align:top;" | 8,738
! style="text-align:right;vertical-align:top;" | 34.86%
|-
| 
| style="text-align:left;" | Daniel Răducanu
| style="text-align:left;" | Democratic Liberal Party (Partidul Democrat-Liberal)
| style="text-align:right;vertical-align:top;" | 7,339
| style="text-align:right;vertical-align:top;" | 29.28%
|-
| 
| style="text-align:left;" | Ţoloaș Liliana
| style="text-align:left;" | PSD+PC Electoral Alliance (Alianţa Electorală PSD+PC)
| style="text-align:right;vertical-align:top;" | 5,218
| style="text-align:right;vertical-align:top;" | 20.81%
|-
| 
| style="text-align:left;" | Nicolae Timiș
| style="text-align:left;" | Independent
| style="text-align:right;vertical-align:top;" | 2,683
| style="text-align:right;vertical-align:top;" | 10.70%
|-
| 
| style="text-align:left;" | Bela Fülöp
| style="text-align:left;" | Democratic Union of Hungarians in Romania (Uniunea Democrată Maghiară din România)
| style="text-align:right;vertical-align:top;" | 438
| style="text-align:right;vertical-align:top;" | 1.75%
|-
| 
| style="text-align:left;" | Remus Cernea
| style="text-align:left;" | Independent
| style="text-align:right;vertical-align:top;" | 269
| style="text-align:right;vertical-align:top;" | 1.07%
|-
| 
| style="text-align:left;" | Mircea Părăian
| style="text-align:left;" | New Generation Party – Christian Democratic (Partidul Noua Generaţie - Creştin Democrat)
| style="text-align:right;vertical-align:top;" | 197
| style="text-align:right;vertical-align:top;" | 0.78%
|-
| 
| style="text-align:left;" | Iosif Danci
| style="text-align:left;" | Christian-Democratic National Peasants' Party (Partidul Naţional Ţărănesc Creştin Democrat)
| style="text-align:right;vertical-align:top;" | 187
| style="text-align:right;vertical-align:top;" | 0.75%
|-
| style="text-align:left;" colspan=4 | Total valid votes (53,222 expected voters) (turnout 48.41% - 25,763)
| style="text-align:right;vertical-align:top;" | 25,069
| style="text-align:right;vertical-align:top;" | 100.00%
|-
| style="text-align:left;" colspan=6 |Source: Autoritatea Electorală Permanentă 
|- 
! rowspan=10 | 21 August 2011
| rowspan=2 | CD 6-29
| 
! style="text-align:left;" | Adrian Rădulescu
! style="text-align:left;" | Democratic Liberal Party (Partidul Democrat-Liberal)
! style="text-align:right;vertical-align:top;" | 17,186
! style="text-align:right;vertical-align:top;" | 54.95%
|-
| 
| style="text-align:left;" | Liviu Harbuz
| style="text-align:left;" | Social-Liberal Union (Uniunea Social Liberală)
| style="text-align:right;vertical-align:top;" | 14,089
| style="text-align:right;vertical-align:top;" | 45.05%
|-
| style="text-align:left;" colspan=4 | Total valid votes (57,996 expected voters) (turnout 53.93% - 32,184)
| style="text-align:right;vertical-align:top;" | 31,275
| style="text-align:right;vertical-align:top;" | 100.00%
|-
| style="text-align:left;" colspan=6 |Source: Autoritatea Electorala Permanenta 
|-
| rowspan=4 | CD 2-26
| 
! style="text-align:left;" | Florin Tătaru
! style="text-align:left;" | Social-Liberal Union (Uniunea Social Liberală)
! style="text-align:right;vertical-align:top;" | 9,433
! style="text-align:right;vertical-align:top;" | 42.67%
|-
| 
| style="text-align:left;" | Mariana Pop
| style="text-align:left;" | Democratic Liberal Party (Partidul Democrat-Liberal)
| style="text-align:right;vertical-align:top;" | 7,845
| style="text-align:right;vertical-align:top;" | 35.48%
|-
| 
| style="text-align:left;" | Mircea Dolha
| style="text-align:left;" | Ecologist Party of Romania (Partidul Ecologist Român)
| style="text-align:right;vertical-align:top;" | 4,338
| style="text-align:right;vertical-align:top;" | 19.62%
|-
| 
| style="text-align:left;" | Felician Horzsa
| style="text-align:left;" | Greater Romania Party (Partidul România Mare)
| style="text-align:right;vertical-align:top;" | 493
| style="text-align:right;vertical-align:top;" | 2.23%
|-
| style="text-align:left;" colspan=4 | Total valid votes (79,241 expected voters) (turnout 27,90% - 22,478)
| style="text-align:right;vertical-align:top;" | 22,109
| style="text-align:right;vertical-align:top;" | 100.00%
|-
| style="text-align:left;" colspan=6 |Source: Biroul Electoral Judeţean 
|-
|}

See also 
 Parliament of Romania

References 

Legislatures of the Romanian Parliament
2008 in Romania
2009 in Romania
2010 in Romania
2011 in Romania
2012 in Romania